Anita Trumpe (born 6 August 1968) is a Latvian hurdler. She competed in the women's 100 metres hurdles at the 2000 Summer Olympics.

References

External links
 

1968 births
Living people
Athletes (track and field) at the 2000 Summer Olympics
Latvian female hurdlers
Olympic athletes of Latvia
Place of birth missing (living people)